Rineloricaria isaaci is a species of catfish in the family Loricariidae. It is native to South America, where it occurs in the Uruguay River basin in Argentina, Brazil, and Uruguay. The species reaches 10.2 cm (4 inches) in standard length and is believed to be a facultative air-breather. Its specific name honors Isaäc J. H. Isbrücker for his contributions to loricariid taxonomy and systematics.

References 

Loricariini
Fish described in 2008
Catfish of South America
Fish of Argentina
Fish of Brazil
Fish of Uruguay